Kostyrine (Russian: Костырино, Ukrainian: Костиріне, Crimean Tatar: Çöñgelek)  is a village in the district of Lenine Raion in Crimea, Russia.

Georgraphy 
Kostyrine is located in the south-east of the district and the Kerch Peninsula, on the southern shore of Tobechytske Lake.

References 

Populated coastal places in Ukraine